Gibson's Hill or Corcreeny is a small village in the townland of Corcreeny in County Armagh, Northern Ireland, about 1.5 km from Lurgan. It lies on the main Lurgan to Gilford road. In the 2001 Census it had a population of 186 people. It is within the Craigavon Borough Council area.

The village has limited community facilities. Lakeview House, to the east, and the area around it, are an attractive landscape and historic feature. It is a two-storey, late-19th-century house, approached through a beech tree avenue.

References

See also 
List of villages in Northern Ireland

Villages in County Armagh